Pseudopomyzella is a genus of flies in the family Pseudopomyzidae.

Distribution
Peru.

Species
Pseudopomyzella flava Hennig, 1969

References

Pseudopomyzidae
Brachycera genera
Taxa named by Willi Hennig
Diptera of South America